Robert Irby Clarke (June 1, 1920 – June 11, 2005) was an American actor best known for his cult classic science fiction films of the 1950s.

Early life
Clarke was born and raised in Oklahoma City, Oklahoma. He decided at an early age that he wanted to be an actor, but nevertheless suffered from stage fright in his first school productions. He attended Kemper Military School and College, planning to make a career in the service, but dropped out after his asthma prevented his serving in World War II.  He later attended the University of Oklahoma, where he acted in radio plays, and the University of Wisconsin–Madison, where he appeared on stage.  He did not graduate, but hitched a ride to California to try to break into the motion picture business.

Career

After screen tests at 20th Century-Fox and Columbia Pictures, Clarke landed a berth as a contract player at RKO Radio Pictures. His first credited role was The Falcon in Hollywood (1944), then went on to play small roles in The Body Snatcher (1945), Bedlam (1946), and Dick Tracy Meets Gruesome (1947). When RKO dropped his option three years later, he began freelancing. In the 1950s, in addition to acting in genre films of all types, he is known for having appeared in several classic science fiction films, including The Man from Planet X (1951),  The Incredible Petrified World (1957), The Astounding She-Monster (1957), From the Earth to the Moon (1958, narrator), Beyond the Time Barrier (1960), and The Hideous Sun Demon (1958), which Clarke wrote, directed and produced. He also appeared in the cult film Captain John Smith and Pocahontas (1953) as John Rolfe,

Clarke revealed in his 1996 autobiography To 'B' or Not to 'B''' (co-written by Tom Weaver) that he made The Hideous Sun Demon for less than $50,000, including $500 for the rubberized lizard suit he wore. He shot the movie over 12 weekends to get two days' use of rental camera equipment for one day's fee. The Hideous Sun Demon was featured in the 1982 movie It Came from Hollywood, and with Clarke's permission, was re-dubbed into the 1983 comedy What's Up, Hideous Sun Demon (aka Revenge of the Sun Demon) featuring the voices of Jay Leno and Cam Clarke reprising his father's role. He later appeared in Alienator in 1990, Midnight Movie Massacre in 1988 and Frankenstein Island in 1981.

From the 1950s through the 1980s, he regularly appeared on television series, including appearing on The King Family Show (1965),. He made two guest appearances on Perry Mason, including the role of circus co-owner and murderer Jerry Franklin in the 1960 episode, "The Case of the Clumsy Clown" and as Jack Harper in the 1957 episode "The Case of the Crooked Candle". Other television appearances included The Lone Ranger, The Cisco Kid, Men Into Space, The Man and the Challenge, Hawaiian Eye, 77 Sunset Strip, Wendy and Me, General Hospital, Marcus Welby, M.D., Dragnet, Adam-12, Sea Hunt, Ripcord, Sky King, Checkmate, M Squad, Daktari, Baa Baa Black Sheep, Hawaii Five-O, Tabitha, Trapper John, M.D., Fantasy Island, Dallas, Simon & Simon, Knight Rider, Murder She Wrote, Matt Houston, Hotel, Dynasty, Falcon Crest, and dozens of others. The 1997 biographical documentary Lugosi: Hollywood's Dracula featured narration which he provided. Clarke's last appearance was in the movie The Naked Monster, a send-up of the classic science fiction films of the 1950s, in 2005.

In the mid-1960s, he served as spokesperson for a furniture and appliance store chain called Gold's Giant Stores. His autobiography, To "B" or Not to "B": A Film Actor's Odyssey, was published in 1996.
In the late it's Clarke co-wrote "The Hideous She Demon" with Michael Goodell, published in Graphic Novella format for EMGEE Comics, and completed as a Screenplay/Shooting Script for EMGEE Studios and Krashenburn Films.

Personal life
Clarke married Alyce King in 1956. They remained wed until her death in 1996. He was the father of actor and voice artist Cam Clarke.

 Death 
Clarke died June 11, 2005, at his home in Valley Village, California from complications of diabetes. He was 85. He was buried in Forest Lawn Memorial Park in Los Angeles.

Selected filmographyThe Falcon in Hollywood (1944) - Perc Saunders - Assistant DirectorWhat a Blonde (1945) - Man (scenes deleted)The Enchanted Cottage (1945) - Marine CorporalThe Body Snatcher (1945) - Richardson - Medical Student (uncredited)Zombies on Broadway (1945) - Wimp (uncredited)Those Endearing Young Charms (1945) - Pilot (uncredited)Back to Bataan (1945) - Soldier (uncredited)Wanderer of the Wasteland (1945) - Jay CollinshawRadio Stars on Parade (1945) - DannyFirst Yank Into Tokyo (1945) - Narrator / Prisoner Rosenbaum (uncredited)Sing Your Way Home (1945) - Reporter at New York Dock (uncredited)Man Alive (1945) - Cabby (uncredited)A Game of Death (1945) - HelmsmanDing Dong Williams (1946) - Club Creon Orchestra Leader (uncredited)Bedlam (1946) - Dan the Dog (uncredited)Sunset Pass (1946) - Ash PrestonThe Bamboo Blonde (1946) - Jonesy, Bamboo Blonde Crewman (uncredited)Step by Step (1946) - The Doctor (uncredited)Genius at Work (1946) - Ralph - Radio Announcer (uncredited)Lady Luck (1946) - Carstairs, the Confederate Officer / Messenger (uncredited)Criminal Court (1946) - Charlie - Club Circle Dance DirectorSan Quentin (1946) - Tommy NorthCode of the West (1947) - Harry StocktonThe Farmer's Daughter (1947) - Assistant Announcer (uncredited)Desperate (1947) - Bus Driver (uncredited)Thunder Mountain (1947) - Lee JorthUnder the Tonto Rim (1947) - HookerDick Tracy Meets Gruesome (1947) - Fred - Police Analyst (uncredited)The Judge Steps Out (1948) - Reporter (uncredited)If You Knew Susie (1948) - Bob - Orchestra Leader (uncredited)Fighting Father Dunne (1948) - Priest (uncredited)Return of the Bad Men (1948) - DaveBeyond Glory (1948) - Bit part (uncredited)Ladies of the Chorus (1948) - Peter Winthrop (uncredited)Riders of the Range (1950) - Harry WillisChampagne for Caesar (1950) - Actor in Movie at Drive-In (uncredited)A Modern Marriage (1950) - Bill BurkeOutrage (1950) - Jim OwensSword of D'Artagnan (1951)The Man from Planet X (1951) - John LawrenceTales of Robin Hood (1951) - Robin HoodHard, Fast and Beautiful (1951) - Gordon McKayManana (1951) - Larry SawyerPistol Harvest (1951) - Jack GreenDrums in the Deep South (1951) - Union Officer (uncredited)Street Bandits (1951) - Fred PalmerThe Valparaiso Story (1951)The Fabulous Senorita (1952) - Jerry TaylorCaptive Women (1952) - RobertSword of Venus (1953) - Robert DantesOiltown, U.S.A. (1953) - Bob JohnsonThe Body Beautiful (1953) - Adam RobertsCaptain John Smith and Pocahontas (1953) - RolfeNew Faces of 1954 (1954) - HimselfHer Twelve Men (1954) - Dream Crown Prince / Junior Senator (uncredited)The Black Pirates (1954) - Manuel AzagaKing of the Carnival (1955) - Jim HayesThe Benny Goodman Story (1956) - Roger Gillespie - Alice's Escort (uncredited)Outlaw Queen (1957) - John AndrewsBand of Angels (1957) - Auction Participant (uncredited)The Helen Morgan Story (1957) - Party Guest (uncredited)My Man Godfrey (1957) - GeorgeThe Astounding She-Monster (1957) - Dick CutlerThe Deep Six (1958) - Ens. David Clough (uncredited)The Hideous Sun Demon (1958, also wrote, directed and produced) - Dr. Gilbert McKennaGirl with an Itch (1958) - Orrie CooperFrom the Earth to the Moon (1958) - Narrator (voice, uncredited)Date with Death (1959) - Joe EmmanuelThe FBI Story (1959) - Bartender (uncredited)The Incredible Petrified World (1959) - Craig RandallTimbuktu (1959) - Captain GirardCash McCall (1960) - Reporter (uncredited)Beyond the Time Barrier (1960) - Maj. William AllisonThe Last Time I Saw Archie (1961) - Officer (uncredited)Sea Hunt (1961, Episode: "Top Secret") - Carl SextonTerror of the Bloodhunters (1962) - Steve DuvalSecret File: Hollywood (1962) - Maxwell CarterThe Lively Set (1964) - Physician (uncredited)Zebra in the Kitchen (1965) - SheriffThe Restless Ones (1965)
’’ Dragnet.(1967) S9-E12 Clayton. Fillmore.— hit and run driver. spmAdam-12 Episode 69 "Log:66 The Vandals" (1970)
Where's Willie? (1978)
Born Again (1978) - Computer Controller
Frankenstein Island (1981) - Dr. Paul Hadley
First Strike (1985)
Midnight Movie Massacre (1988) - Col Carlyle
Alienator (1990) - Lund
The Naked Monster (2005) - Major Allison (final film role)

References

External links

 
 

1920 births
2005 deaths
American male film actors
American film directors
Male actors from Oklahoma City
Deaths from diabetes
University of Wisconsin–Madison alumni
Burials at Forest Lawn Memorial Park (Hollywood Hills)
RKO Pictures contract players
King family (show business)